Kosi Saka (born 4 February 1986) is a footballer who plays as a midfielder for German Oberliga side Sportfreunde Baumberg. He made three appearances for the DR Congo national team in 2008.

Club career
In the 2006–07 season, Saka played for FC Carl Zeiss Jena on loan from Hamburger SV. After being released by Hamburger SV in July 2009, he spent a half year without a club, and on 10 January 2010, he signed for KFC Uerdingen.

International career
Born in Zaire, Saka earned three caps for the DR Congo national team.

References

External links
 

Living people
1986 births
Democratic Republic of the Congo footballers
Association football midfielders
Democratic Republic of the Congo international footballers
Bundesliga players
2. Bundesliga players
Hamburger SV players
Hamburger SV II players
Borussia Dortmund players
Borussia Dortmund II players
FC Carl Zeiss Jena players
KFC Uerdingen 05 players
Democratic Republic of the Congo expatriate footballers
Democratic Republic of the Congo expatriate sportspeople in Germany
Expatriate footballers in Germany
21st-century Democratic Republic of the Congo people